Antony James Moulds (born 4 February 1988) is a semi-professional footballer who currently plays as a defender for Europa Point in the Gibraltar National League. Born in England and a former schoolboy international, he currently represents the Gibraltar national football team at international level.

International career
After naturalising for Gibraltar in 2019, Moulds made his international debut for Los Llanis on 27 March 2021 in a 2022 FIFA World Cup qualifying game against Montenegro.

References

1988 births
Living people
People from Dunstable
Footballers from Bedfordshire
Gibraltarian footballers
Gibraltar international footballers
English footballers
English people of Gibraltarian descent
Association football defenders
Barton Rovers F.C. players
F.C. Boca Gibraltar players
Europa Point F.C. players
Leighton Town F.C. players
Raynes Park Vale F.C. players
St Joseph's F.C. players
Gibraltar Premier Division players